Bloody Heart is a 2022 South Korean television series starring Lee Joon, Kang Han-na, Jang Hyuk, Park Ji-yeon, Heo Sung-tae, and Choi Ri. It aired from May 2 to June 21, 2022 on KBS2's Mondays and Tuesdays at 21:30 (KST) time slot for 16 episodes. It is also available for streaming on Disney+ in selected regions.

Synopsis
Bloody Heart is a fictional historical drama about King Seonjong who ascends to the throne due to a rebellion, and Lee Tae who becomes the king after him.

It follows the story of Lee Tae—a king who has to abandon the woman he loves to survive, Yoo Jeong—a woman who has to become the queen to survive, and Park Gye-won—the first vice-premier and the real head of power in Joseon.

Cast

Main
 Lee Joon as Lee Tae
 Park Ji-bin as young Lee Tae
 He becomes the King of Joseon after King Seonjong. He dreams of absolute monarchy and becoming a powerful ruler, unlike his father. He believes any action is justifiable to achieve his goal.
 Kang Han-na as Yoo Jeong
 Shin Eun-soo as young Yoo Jeong 
 A free-spirited woman whom Lee Tae falls in love with. Lee Tae picks her as his crown princess and she gets tangled up in the battle for power, which leads to a crisis in her family.
 Jang Hyuk as Park Gye-won
 The first vice-premier who is a living symbol of power and a figure that everyone obeys. He is a "king maker" who is determined to create a wise and benevolent king, in order not to shake the foundations of Joseon by a tyrant ever again.
 Park Ji-yeon as Choi Ga-yeon
 King Seonjong's Queen Consort whose first love is Park Gye-won.
 Heo Sung-tae as Jo Won-pyo
 Minister of War whose ambitions are blocked by Park Gye-won.
 Choi Ri as Jo Yeon-hee
 Jo Won-pyo's daughter who is immature and arrogant.

Supporting

People around Lee Tae
 Ha Do-kwon as Jung Eui-kyun
 Ahn Nae-sang as King Seonjong
 Woo Mi-hwa as Queen Inyeong

People around Yoo Jeong
 Yoon Seo-ah as Ddong-geum
 Park Sung-yeon as Court Lady Choi
 Ryu Seung-soo as Im Jin-sa
 Jo Hee-bong as Ma Seo-bang 
 Kim Sun-hwa as Ma Seo-bang's wife

People around Park Gye-won
 Lee Tae-ri as Park Nam-sang
 Seo Yoo-jung as Madam Yoon
 Jung Young-sub as Park Song-baek

Others
 Kang Shin-il as Kim Chi-won
 Cha Soon-bae as Heo Sang-seon
 Jo Young-hoon as Jo Sa-hyung
 Park Ji-a as Court Lady Han
 Lee Seon-hee as Court Lady Kim
 Lee Seung-hoon as Noh Kyung-moon
 Oh Seung-hoon as Hye Kang
 Kang Yeo-jung as Eum Jeon

Extended
 Lee Chang-jik as Minister of Interior
 Seo Hye-won as Hyang-yi

Special appearance
 Hahm Eun-jung as Yoon Jung-jeon

Production
Filming locations of the series include Yeongwol County, and Yeolhwajeong Pavilion—located in Ganggol Village, Deungnyang-myeon, Boseong County.

On February 3, 2022, it was announced that filming was canceled for that day after a staff and an unnamed actor tested positive for COVID-19. All production crew members subsequently underwent PCR test. A day later, it was revealed that Park Ji-yeon and Yoon Seo-ah tested positive for COVID-19.

On February 11, 2022, it was confirmed that actor Heo Sung-tae also tested positive for COVID-19, forcing filming to be canceled for that day. Later on February 16, Heo fully recovered from the contagion and resumed his filming schedules.

On March 11, 2022, Ha Do-kwon's agency announced that the actor tested positive for COVID-19 on the afternoon of the 10th, and all his filming schedules were cancelled.

Original soundtrack

Part 1

Part 2

Part 3

Part 4

Part 5

Part 6

Viewership

Note

References

External links
  
 
 

Korean-language television shows
Korean Broadcasting System television dramas
South Korean historical television series
South Korean romance television series
Television series set in the Joseon dynasty
2022 South Korean television series debuts
2022 South Korean television series endings
Television productions suspended due to the COVID-19 pandemic